Donald James Warren (born May 5, 1956) is a retired American football scout and former tight end who played his entire 14-year career with the Washington Redskins of the National Football League (NFL). He was drafted by them in the fourth round of the 1979 NFL Draft and retired following the 1992 season. He has since served as a scout for the Carolina Panthers and Redskins.

High school and college career
Warren was born in Bellingham, Washington and raised in California.  He attended and played high school football at Royal Oak High School in Covina, California. Warren attended and played college football first at Mt. San Antonio College, and later transferred to San Diego State University.  He played in the East–West Shrine Game after the 1978 season.

Professional career
While with the Redskins, Warren was a member of three Super Bowl-winning teams, following the 1982, 1987, and 1991 seasons; additionally he was a member of the team that went to and did not win the Super Bowl following the 1983 season, a team which offensively set the record for number of points scored in one season, a record which remained for 15 years. Known as an excellent blocker, Warren was an original member of "The Hogs", a nickname given to the Redskins offensive line in the 1980s.

After retiring following the 1992 season, Warren spent several years as baseball and football coach. In 2005, he rejoined the Redskins as a scout before joining the Carolina Panthers in 2010, serving as a scout for them until 2019. He rejoined Washington, known at the time as the Washington Football Team, as a senior pro scout in 2020. Warren announced his retirement from scouting in June 2022.

References

 

1956 births
Living people
American football tight ends
Carolina Panthers executives
Carolina Panthers scouts
Mt. SAC Mounties football players
Players of American football from Washington (state)
San Diego State Aztecs football players
Sportspeople from Bellingham, Washington
Washington Commanders scouts
Washington Football Team scouts
Washington Redskins players
Washington Redskins scouts
Ed Block Courage Award recipients